Kitne Door Kitne Paas is a 2002 Indian Hindi romance film. It stars Fardeen Khan and Amrita Arora.

Story 
Two young Indians, a male named Jatin, and a woman named Karishma, meet on an airplane, who are on their way to India. Jatin is returning home to marry Jaya, who has been chosen for him by his mother. Karishma is also returning to India to marry an Indian named Nimesh. Their paths cross, and despite of the difference in their temperaments, both are attracted to each other. Both would like to get married, but also realize and stand by their commitment to Jaya and Nimesh. Also the parents are against the marriage at first but then Jaya at the wedding explains how one cannot be forced into marriage and she didn't want to marry Jatin. A fire then starts and Jatin saves Karishma and Nimesh backs out so her father thinks Jatin is better for her and Jatin and Karishma marry at the end.

Cast

Fardeen Khan as Jatin
Amrita Arora as  Karishma
Nasirr Khan as Jaikishen "Jackie" 
Ayub Khan aa  Nimesh
Sonali Kulkarni as  Jaya Patel
Satish Shah as  Veer Singh / Jeet Singh Rathod / Bhanwar Singh
Ketki Dave as  Koki, Jaya's mother
Tiku Talsania as  Babu Patel
Govind Namdeo
Beena ...  Rama
Ram Mohan
Lilette Dubey
Shehzad Khan as Police Inspector K.K. Limbachia

Soundtrack
Music by Sanjeev Darshan.

References

External links

2000s Hindi-language films
2002 films
Films directed by Mehul Kumar